The Joliet Junction Railroad was a six-mile long short line freight railroad that operated in the Joliet, Illinois, area from 1994 until 1999.

History 

The line, which ran between Crest Hill and Rockdale, Illinois, was a former branch line of the Elgin, Joliet and Eastern Railway, which had been out of service since 1991, after a fire severely damaged a wooden trestle.

In 1994, Minooka, Illinois, businessman Donald L. "Don" Bachman, who owned a locomotive-rebuilding company called Relco, founded the Joliet Junction Railroad, acquiring its trackage from the EJ&E, which had sought to abandon it after the fire.  Bachman learned that it would cost $90,000 to replace the bridge, plus significantly more for other expenses to bring the line up to code.  As a result, he applied for and received a $390,000 loan from the Illinois Department of Transportation to fund additional improvements.

Abandonment 

The Joliet Junction Railroad ceased operations in the summer of 1999.  Bachman and Relco then sold the trackage for $467,424 to the Forest Preserve District of Will County, which created a bike path, called the Joliet Junction bike trail, over the former right-of-way.

Connections 

The Joliet Junction connected local shippers with the national railroad network at two connection points: with the EJ&E at Crest Hill, Illinois, and with CSX Transportation at Rockdale, Illinois.

References

External links 
 Joliet Junction bike trail

Defunct Illinois railroads
Railway companies established in 1994
Railway companies disestablished in 1999